Kazuha (written: 一葉, 円葉 or 和葉) is a feminine Japanese given name.

People with this name
, Japanese singer-songwriter

Fictional characters
, supporting character in Detective Conan
Kazuha Aoi, a character in Freezing
Kazuha Migiwa, a character in Yosuga no Sora
Kazuha, a male character in Noragami
Kazuha Kaedehara, a male character in Genshin Impact

Japanese feminine given names